Deepa Bhaskar is an Indian film and theatre actress, voice artist and classical dancer. Considered by many to be a child prodigy who was introduced to the film industry through Tiger Prabhakar's movie Mahendra Varma. She acted in movies like Deepavali, Srirastu Shubhamastu and Putti and as a lead actress in My Autograph and No 73, Shanthi Nivasa.

She acted in serials such as Male billu, Preeti illada mele, Chakravaka, Paarijatha, Anavarana, Paapa pandu, G.V.Iyer's Adrushtada horaata, Ninolumeindale, Madarangi, saakshi for Udaya TV and Subbalakshmi samsara for Zee Kannada Hindi serial Choti Maa.
She is currently working with theatre group Ananya's play titled Gathi. Gathi is a realistic play based on relevant social issues. Set in present-day urban society, this drama follows a man and his granddaughter. It explores changes in the mindset in the sixty years since independence and its eventual effect on day-to-day social life and family structures.
Directed by S.N.Sethuram and casts S.N.Sethuram and Deepa

Her first movie as a dubbing artist was Abhi for Ramya, She has dubbed over 250 movies, including Jogi, Mungaru Male, Duniya, Super, Saarathi, Gaja, Raam, Just Math Mathalli, Taj Mahal, Paramathma , Jaggu Dada , Raju Kannada Medium , Mungaru Male 2 , Ranna , Googly , ''Sundaranga Jaana. She is sometimes credited as Deepu.

She learned Kathak under Nirupama Rajendra and T.D. Rajendra. She traveled with them to the USA and UK and performed with them at dance festivals all over India.

Awards

Aryabhata award for best child anchor (putani.com-a children talk show)
State award for the best child actor female - 'Putti'(2001)
State award for best dubbing artist female -'Ranga SSLC'(2004)
State award for best dubbing artist female - 'Arasu'(2006)
State award for best dubbing artist female - 'Just Math Mathalli'(2009)
 Zee Kutumba Awards Best Actor in Lead Role Female - 'Subbalakshmi Samsara' (2018,2017)
 Zee Kutumba Awards Best Actress forever in Zee Kannada - 'Subbalakshmi Samsara' (2019)

References

 Synchronising with stars

Living people
Year of birth missing (living people)
Indian voice actresses
Indian child actresses
Indian film actresses